Sydenham High School is an independent day school for 4- to 18-year-old girls located in London, England. Sydenham High School was founded by the Girls’ Public Day School Trust in 1887. Since then, the original school roll of 20 pupils has grown to 724 girls. The school is separated into the senior and prep schools, each with a separate site on Westwood Hill in Sydenham.

History
The school was created by the Girls’ Public Day School Trust in 1887 with an initial school roll of twenty and Ms I Thomas as the founding head.

In 1901 the mathematics graduate Helen Sheldon became the school's second head teacher. She created the school's first orchestra. She introduced the idea of senior girls becoming prefects and she divided the school into houses. Sheldon's family had left her money and she used some of this to offer her school interest free loans. A minor addition was a school pavilion that was created from an old tram, but the major additions was to the school grounds. Using the money she lent to the school the campus was increased by the purchase of adjoining land. In 1910 Sheldon obtained permission for the school's buildings to be increased by the use of two former residential houses. Sheldon retired in 1917.

In April 1934, the school moved to Horner Grange, a former house built for diamond magnate William Knight in 1884, where he lived until his death in 1900. The premises subsequently became a hotel before the school bought the freehold. It was damaged by fire in 1997, but the building was restored.

The school's original Anglo Saxon motto, Nyle ye drede, means "fear nothing" and is adopted by the school as a whole. As distinct cohorts within a shared community, the school actively encourage pupils to step outside their comfort zones, developing both independence of mind and the courage to take risks. 2022 marks the school's 135th anniversary and has refreshed its straplines for each of the three sections of the school: "Flourish and Fly" (Prep), "Use Your Voice" (Senior) and "Own Your Future" (Sixth) whilst alumnae "Lead The Way".

Headmistresses

 Miss Irene Thomas, 1887-1901
 Miss Helen Sheldon, 1901-1917
 Miss Sanders, 1917-1930
 Miss Smith, 1931-1941
 Miss Yardley, 1942-1966
 Miss Hamilton, 1966-1987
 Mrs Baker, 1988-1999
 Dr Lodge, 1999-2002
 Mrs Pullen, 2002-2016
 Mrs Woodcock, 2017-2022

Notable former pupils

G. E. M. Anscombe, philosopher
Elly Jackson, lead singer with pop group La Roux
Emily Joyce, actress
Gertrude Leverkus (1899–1976), architect
Margaret Lockwood (1916-1990), actress
Sophie McKenzie, author of books such as Blood Ties
Khadijah Mellah (b.2000) first competitive jockey to wear the hajib and winner of the Magnolia Cup at Goodwood
Sandy Powell, BAFTA-winning costume designer
Florence Rawlings, musician
Kathleen Shackleton (1884-1961), artist

Notes and references

External links 
 Sydenham High School

Private girls' schools in London
Educational institutions established in 1887
Private schools in the London Borough of Lewisham
Schools of the Girls' Day School Trust
1887 establishments in England
Sydenham, London